Scoil Éigse is the official summer school organised by Comhaltas Ceoltóirí Éireann where Irish people and students from the United Kingdom, Europe, Asia and North America go to obtain a better and deeper understanding of Irish music and culture.

The school provides workshops, lectures, concerts and sessions in the week prior to the Fleadh Cheoil na hÉireann and continues each day during the Fleadh.

Tuition is given in traditional music, song, and dance each day with informal céilíthe and sessions each evening.

See also
Queen Maeve International Summer School
Willie Clancy Summer School
Fleadh Cheoil

References

See also
Celtic music
Irish Recorded Music Association
Irish topics
Irish traditional music session

Music schools in the Republic of Ireland
Irish folk music

da:Irsk folkemusik
de:Irish Folk
fr:Musique traditionnelle irlandaise
nl:Ierse folk
no:Irsk folkemusikk